A descender is the portion of a letter that extends below the baseline of a font.

Descender may also refer to:
 A cyclist who excels at fast descents (see Glossary of cycling)
 A piece of rock-climbing equipment (see Rappel devices (descenders))
 Descender (album) by Andrew Wyatt, 2013
 Descender, a comic series by Jeff Lemire
 Descenders (video game), 2018